David Branch (born November 27, 1948) is a Canadian ice hockey administrator. His lengthy involvement in junior ice hockey includes serving as commissioner of the Ontario Hockey League since September 15, 1979, and serving as president of the Canadian Hockey League from 1996 to 2019. He received the Order of Hockey in Canada in 2016.

Early life
David Branch was born on November 27, 1948, in Bathurst, New Brunswick. He played NCAA hockey while attending the University of Massachusetts Amherst on a scholarship. After graduating, he moved to Whitby, Ontario, and became involved in coaching minor ice hockey with the Whitby Wildcats organization, and hockey camps run by Wren Blair and Jim Gregory.

Executive career
Branch served as secretary-manager of the Ontario Hockey Association from 1973 to 1977. He was hired by Gord Renwick in 1978 to become the new executive director of the Canadian Amateur Hockey Association for the retiring Gordon Juckes. He served in that role until 1979. Branch played a role in the founding of the Ontario Hockey League, by negotiating the split of its predecessor, the OMJHL from the OHA. He became commissioner of the OMJHL in 1979, and the independent OHL in 1980. He became president of the Canadian Hockey League (CHL) in 1996.

Branch helped develop a scholarship program that affords all players one year of post-secondary education per season played in the league. Branch has advocated for player safety, anti-violence, and mental health. He was instrumental in adopting rules to reduce the number of fights in the OHL. Branch was part of introducing a blindside hit rule in the OHL, and aims to have all members of the CHL introduce similar rules.

Dan MacKenzie succeeded Branch as the CHL president in September 2019, while Branch continued as the OHL commissioner.

Honours and awards
Branch is a member of the Hockey Hall of Fame selection committee. He was honoured with the Order of Hockey in Canada in 2016, and he was inducted into the Whitby Sports Hall of Fame as a builder in 2017.

Personal life
Branch is the father of Barclay Branch, who served as a general manager in the OHL.

References

1948 births
Living people
Canadian Amateur Hockey Association personnel
Canadian Hockey League executives
Canadian sports executives and administrators
Ontario Hockey Association executives
Ontario Hockey League
Order of Hockey in Canada recipients
People from Bathurst, New Brunswick
University of Massachusetts Amherst alumni